Alcenya Crowley (April 3, 1926 – September 12, 2010), born Alcenya McElwain, was an American-born Canadian educator and activist.

Early life and education 
Alcenya McElwain was born in St. Paul, Minnesota, the daughter of William McElwain. She was educated at the Minneapolis School of Business. She later studied marketing at Ryerson University and earned a degree in political science from York University.

Career 
Crowley worked in a law office, in an accountant's office, at the Metropolitan Children's Aid Society, and then as a secretary for the Canadian Broadcasting Corporation. She later taught business for the Toronto District School Board, retiring in 1991.

Crowley joined the Canadian Negro Women's Association (CANEWA), later the Congress of Black Women of Canada. She served as vice-president from 1957 to 1958 and as president from 1959 to 1960. She chaired CANEWA's first Calypso Carnival, drawing on the cultures of the organization's Caribbean-born members. She represented CANEWA at the funeral of Martin Luther King Jr.

Personal life 
She married a Canadian podiatrist, William Richard "Buddy" Crowley, in 1951, and moved to Toronto with him. 

Crowley was widowed when her husband died in 1963; she died in Credit Valley Hospital in 2010, at the age of 84.

References

External links 

 
 Funké Omotunde Aladejebi, "'Girl You Better Apply to Teachers’ College': The History of Black Women Educators in Ontario, 1940s –1980s" (Ph.D. dissertation, York University 2016). 

1926 births
2010 deaths
Canadian schoolteachers
Black Canadian women
Canadian civil rights activists
Women civil rights activists
American emigrants to Canada
Toronto Metropolitan University alumni
York University alumni
Black Canadian activists